Ion Motroc (born 14 February 1937) is a former Romanian football defender who played for clubs in Romania and Turkey.

Club career
Ion Motroc was born on 14 February 1937 in Bucharest, growing up in the Giulești neighborhood, starting to play junior level football in 1950 at local club Locomotiva București, making his Divizia A debut for the senior squad under coach Iosif Lengheriu on 17 May 1953 at age 16 in a 0–0 against Știința Cluj. He went to play for one season at Progresul CPCS București in Divizia B, afterwards going to play for Dinamo București where over the course of three seasons he won the 1958–59 Cupa României. He returned to the team from his Giulești neighborhood, Rapid where he accepted a lower salary because he wanted to come back to the place he grew up. Motroc spent 9 seasons at Rapid in which he helped the club win the 1966–67 Divizia A which was the first title in the club's history, being used by coach Valentin Stănescu in 25 matches, also being the team's captain. He also reached two Cupa României finals in 1961 and 1962 which were lost in front of Arieșul Turda respectively Steaua București and won two Balkans Cup in 1964 and 1966. Motroc played 5 games in European competitions (including one appearance in the Inter-cities Fairs Cup), taking part in the 1967–68 European Cup campaign in which he helped Rapid eliminate Trakia Plovdiv, being eliminated by Juventus in the following round. He made his last Divizia A match on 15 June 1969 in a 3–0 victory against Jiul Petroșani, having a total of 265 matches played in the competition scoring one goal in April 1961 from a scissors kick in a 2–1 victory against Dinamo, also having 34 matches and one goal scored in the Cupa României. In 1969, alongside his Rapid teammate Viorel Kraus, Motroc went to play in the Turkish First Football League for half of season at Altay Izmir, appearing in 8 league matches, returning to Romania where he ended his career by playing two games in Divizia B at Sportul Studențesc București.

International career
Ion Motroc made two appearances for Romania, making his debut on 14 May 1961 under coach Gheorghe Popescu I in a friendly which ended with a 1–0 away victory against Turkey. His second game was also an away game against Turkey, this time the result being a 2–1 loss at the 1966 World Cup qualifiers.

Managerial career

Ion Motroc started his managerial career in 1970 at Sportul Studențesc București, a team he helped promote to the first league, after which he coached Turkish team, Mersin İdmanyurdu. In 1974 he coached Rapid București, helping the team win the 1974–75 Cupa României while playing in Divizia B after eliminating Dinamo București, Jiul Petroșani, Ceahlăul Piatra Neamț, Steaua București and defeating with 2–1 Universitatea Craiova in the final, also earning the promotion to Divizia A at the end of the season. In the following season he coached Rapid in the 1975–76 European Cup Winners' Cup where they were eliminated in the first round with 2–1 on aggregate by Anderlecht who would eventually win the competition, this being his only experience in the European competitions as coach. He went on to coach FCM Reșița, Politehnica Iași and Chindia Târgoviște in Divizia A, also having two more spells at Rapid, the first in the 1980–81 Divizia B season and the second as an assistant coach in the 1988–89 Divizia A season, having a total of 124 games managed in Divizia A and 111 in Divizia B. He also had some spells in Africa at MC Oujda and Raja Casablanca from Morocco and Al-Merrikh from Sudan.

Personal life
Ion Motroc is the father of Florin Motroc who was also footballer and a manager and the grandfather of Vlad Motroc, who played football in the Romanian lower leagues.

Honours

Player
Dinamo București
Cupa României: 1958–59
Rapid București
Divizia A: 1966–67
Cupa României runner-up: 1960–61, 1961–62
Balkans Cup: 1963–64, 1964–66

Manager
Sportul Studențesc București
Divizia B: 1971–72
Rapid București
Divizia B: 1974–75
Cupa României: 1974–75

References

External links

1937 births
Living people
Footballers from Bucharest
Romanian footballers
Romanian expatriate footballers
Romania international footballers
FC Dinamo București players
FC Rapid București players
Altay S.K. footballers
FC Sportul Studențesc București players
Liga I players
Liga II players
Süper Lig players
Romanian football managers
FC Sportul Studențesc București managers
FC Rapid București managers
CSM Reșița managers
Mersin İdman Yurdu managers
Raja CA managers
FCM Târgoviște managers
Romanian expatriate football managers
Romanian expatriate sportspeople in Turkey
Romanian expatriate sportspeople in Morocco
Romanian expatriate sportspeople in Sudan
Expatriate footballers in Turkey
Expatriate football managers in Turkey
Expatriate football managers in Sudan
Association football defenders